Andrea Cupi (born 27 January 1976) is an Italian former professional footballer who played as a defender.

Cupi played for Empoli where he spent much of his career and played over 100 games before he signed for Napoli on a free transfer in January 2006.

References

1976 births
Living people
People from Frascati
Association football defenders
Italian footballers
A.C. Carpi players
S.S.C. Napoli players
Empoli F.C. players
Serie A players
Serie B players
Serie D players
Footballers from Lazio
Sportspeople from the Metropolitan City of Rome Capital